Wilcockson is a surname. Notable people with the surname include:

Stan Wilcockson (1905–1965), English footballer
Steve Wilcockson (born 1951), British Anglican priest

See also
Wilcocks

Patronymic surnames